Amanda Aizpuriete (born 28 March 1956 in Jūrmala) is a Latvian poet and translator.

Biography 
Aizpuriete has published seven collections of poems in Latvian. Her works have been translated into at least 14 languages.

Eric Funk composed a symphony for contralto and orchestra, This Eventide Seems Spoiled, using her poetry.

Notable awards include the Horst Bienek Poetry Prize from the Bavaria Academy of Art (1999), Poetry Days' Prize in Latvia (2000) and the Annual Prize in Literature for the best poetry translation (2003).

She has translated works by Anna Akhmatova, Virginia Woolf, Franz Kafka, Georg Trakl, Joseph Brodsky and other writers.

Bibliography

Books in Latvian 
 "Nāks dārzā māte". Rīga: Liesma, 1980
 "Kāpu iela". Rīga: Liesma, 1986
 "Nākamais autobuss" [arī atdzeja]. Rīga: Liesma, 1990
 "Pēdējā vasara". Rīga: Preses nams, 1995
 "Bābeles nomalē". Rīga: Enigma, 1999 
 "Sārtu baložu bars" [pastkaršu komplekts ar dzejoļiem]. Rīga, 1999
 "Vēstuļu vējš". Rīga: Atēna, 2004
 "ledusskapja šūpuļdziesma" [dzeja un proza]. Rīga: Mansards, 2011

Books in translation 
 Die Untiefen des Verrats. Reinbek: Rowohlt, 1993.
 Lass mir das Meer. Reinbek: Rowohlt, 1996. 
 Babylonischer Kiez. Reinbek: Rowohlt, 2000.
 Så som skymningen älskar dig. Lund Ariel Ellerström, 2002.
 Сумерки тебя любят. Riga: ALIS, 2005.
 Vihreäsilmäinen yö. Turku: Sammakko, 2006.
 Plaukiotoja naktimis. Šiauliai University, 2009.

References

1956 births
Living people
People from Jūrmala
Latvian women poets
Latvian translators
20th-century Latvian women writers
21st-century Latvian women writers
20th-century translators
21st-century translators
20th-century Latvian poets